The 1987 Benson and Hedges Open was a men's Grand Prix tennis tournament played on outdoor hard courts in Auckland, New Zealand. It was the 20th edition of the tournament and was held from 5 January to 11 January 1987. First-seeded Miloslav Mečíř won the singles title.

Finals

Singles

 Miloslav Mečíř defeated  Michiel Schapers 6–2, 6–3, 6–4
 It was Mečíř's 1st title of the year and the 6th of his career.

Doubles
 Kelly Jones /  Brad Pearce defeated  Carl Limberger /  Mark Woodforde 7–6, 7–6
 It was Jones's only title of the year and the 1st of his career. It was Pearce's only title of the year and the 2nd of his career.

References

External links
 
 ATP – tournament profile
 ITF – tournament edition details

Heineken Open
Heineken
ATP Auckland Open
January 1987 sports events in New Zealand